Beringius kennicottii, common name Kenicott's beringius, is a species of sea snail or true whelk, a marine gastropod mollusc in the family Buccinidae, the true whelks.

References

Buccinidae
Gastropods described in 1871